= San José Alto =

Coordinates: 17.7239°S 67.7536°W

- Town
- Interactive map of San José Alto
- Country: Bolivia
- Time zone: UTC-4 (BOT)

San José Alto is a small town in Bolivia.
